James Coffman may refer to:

James H. Coffman Jr., United States Army officer who was awarded the Distinguished Service Cross
James Burton Coffman (1905–2006), Churches of Christ minister